Beer (also known as The Selling of America) is a 1985 American comedy film produced by Orion Pictures that satirizes the advertising industry, specifically the TV commercial industry.

Plot
Cynical ad executive B. D. Tucker (Loretta Swit) is desperate not to lose the account of the financially ailing Norbecker Brewery. When three losers (David Alan Grier, William Russ, and Saul Stein) inadvertently prevent a robbery in a bar, Tucker and her minions give them a macho image and center an entire ad campaign around them.

Cast
 Loretta Swit as B. D. Tucker
 Rip Torn as Buzz Beckman
 David Alan Grier as Elliott Morrison
 Kenneth Mars as Norbecker
 William Russ as Draggett
 Dick Shawn as Talk Show Host

External links
 
 

1985 films
1985 comedy films
American comedy films
American satirical films
1980s English-language films
Films scored by Bill Conti
Films about advertising
Films shot in Toronto
Orion Pictures films
Films produced by Robert Chartoff
1980s American films
Films about alcoholism